Chlorotrifluoromethane, R-13, CFC-13, or Freon 13, is a non-flammable, non-corrosive chlorofluorocarbon (CFC) and also a mixed halomethane.  It is a man-made substance used primarily as a refrigerant.  When released into the environment, CFC-13 has a high ozone depletion potential, high global warming potential, and long atmospheric lifetime.

Preparation
It can be prepared by reacting carbon tetrachloride with hydrogen fluoride in the presence of a catalytic amount of antimony pentachloride:

CCl4 + 3HF → CClF3 + 3HCl

This reaction can also produce trichlorofluoromethane (CCl3F), dichlorodifluoromethane (CCl2F2) and tetrafluoromethane (CF4).

Production phaseout
Per the international Montreal Protocol, CFC-13 began a phase out and replacement with alternative substances starting in the early 1990s that will culminate in a global ban on its production.  The atmospheric abundance of CFC-13 rose from 3.0 parts per trillion (ppt) in year 2010 to 3.3 ppt in year 2020 based on analysis of air samples gathered from sites around the world.

Physical properties

See also 
 IPCC list of greenhouse gases
 List of refrigerants

References

External links
 MSDS at mathesontrigas.com
 
 Entry at Air Liquide gas encyclopaedia
 The crystal structure of chlorotrifluoromethane, CF3Cl; neutron powder diffraction and constrained refinement
 Termochemical data table

Chlorofluorocarbons
Halomethanes
Refrigerants
Greenhouse gases
Ozone depletion
Trifluoromethyl compounds